William H. Rowe (February 25, 1860 – May 6, 1947) was an American businessman, farmer, and politician.

Biography
Rowe was born in Fayette County, Illinois. He moved with his parents in 1864 and settled near Saybrook, Illinois. Rowe was a farmer and livestock dealer. He was involved with the banking business. Rowe served on the McLean County Board of Supervisors and was chairman of the county board. He also served on the school board and the Cheney's Grove town board. Rowe served in the Illinois House of Representatives from 1913 to 1923 and was a Republican. In 1923, Rowe moved to Bloomington, Illinois. Rowe died at Brokaw Hospital in Bloomington, Illinois.

References

1860 births
1947 deaths
People from Fayette County, Illinois
People from McLean County, Illinois
Businesspeople from Illinois
Farmers from Illinois
Illinois city council members
School board members in Illinois
County board members in Illinois
Republican Party members of the Illinois House of Representatives